The Museum II is the second Greatest hits album by Japanese voice actress and pop singer Nana Mizuki. It was released on November 23, 2011 in two editions: a CD+DVD edition and a CD+Blu-ray edition. Every edition includes a special bonus: the Music Clip of Pop Master and the Nana mizuki's performance in Nakano Sun Plaza "Mizuki Nana Ooini Utau". The Museum II reached number 3 in the Oricon Weekly charts and number 2 in the Taiwanese J-pop charts.

Track listing
Secret Ambition (15th single)
Lyrics: Nana Mizuki
Composition: Chiyomaru Shikura
Arrangement: Hitoshi Fujima (Elements Garden)
First opening theme for anime television series Magical Girl Lyrical Nanoha Strikers
Massive Wonders (16th single)
Lyrics: Nana Mizuki
Composition, arrangement: Toshiro Yabuki
Second opening theme for anime television series Magical Girl Lyrical Nanoha StrikerS.
Ending theme in August for Nippon TV show .
Astrogation (17th single)
Lyrics: Hibiki
Composition, arrangement: Jun Suyama
Theme in February for TV program Music Fighter
Trickster (18th single)
Lyrics: Nana Mizuki
Composition, arrangement: Noriyasu Agematsu (Elements Garden)
Animelo Music TV-CF and "Music Fighter" Power Play
 Shin'ai (19th single)
Lyrics: Nana Mizuki
Composition: Noriyasu Agematsu (Elements Garden)
Arrangement: Hitoshi Fujima (Elements Garden)
Opening theme for anime television series White Album
 Mugen (20th single)
Lyrics: Nana Mizuki
Composition: Noriyasu Agematsu (Elements Garden)
Arrangement: Junpei Fujita
Second opening theme for anime television series White Album
Phantom Minds (21st single)
Lyrics: Nana Mizuki
Composition: Eriko Yoshiki
Arrangement: Jun Suyama
Opening theme for anime film Magical Girl Lyrical Nanoha The Movie 1st
Silent Bible (22nd single)
Lyrics: Nana Mizuki
Composition: Haruki Mori (Elements Garden)
Arrangement: Daisuke Kikuta (Elements Garden)
Opening theme for PlayStation Portable game Magical Girl Lyrical Nanoha A's Portable: The Battle of Aces
Scarlet Knight (23rd single)
Lyrics: Nana Mizuki
Composition, arrangement: Hitoshi Fujima (Elements Garden)
Opening theme for anime television series Dog Days
Ending theme for TV Asahi program Onegai! Ranking in April
Ending theme for Ehime Asahi TV program  Love Chu! Chu! in April
Pop Master (24th single)
Lyrics, composition: Nana Mizuki
Arrangement: Hitoshi Fujima (Elements Garden)
Cheering song for NTV's 31st High School Quiz
Theme song for mobile game Idol o Tsukuro
Junketsu Paradox (25th single)
Lyrics: Nana Mizuki
Composition: Eriko Yoshiki
Arrangement: Jun Suyama
Ending theme for anime television series Blood-C
Pray
Lyrics: Hibiki
Composition, arrangement: Noriyasu Agematsu (Elements Garden)
Insert song for anime television series Magical Girl Lyrical Nanoha StrikerS
 Cosmic Love
Lyrics: Ryōji Sonoda
Composition, arrangement: Junpei Fujita (Elements Garden)
Opening theme for anime television series Rosario to Vampire.
 Discotheque
Lyrics: Ryōji Sonoda
Composition, arrangement: Noriyasu Agematsu (Elements Garden)
Opening theme for anime television series Rosario to Vampire Capu2.
 Meikyuu Butterfly -diverse-
Lyrics: Peach-Pit, Yuuya Saitou
Composition: Daice
Arrangement: Junpei Fujita
Remixed version of the original Meikyuu Butterfly song from the anime television series Shugo Chara!
 Romancers' Neo
Lyrics: Hibiki
Composition: Noriyasu Agematsu (Elements Garden)
Arrangement: Junpei Fujita (Elements Garden)
Opening theme for PlayStation Portable game Magical Girl Lyrical Nanoha A's Portable: The Gears of Destiny
 Super Generation -Museum Style-
Lyrics, composition: Nana Mizuki
Arrangement: Mika Agematsu
Remixed slower version of the original Super Generation song

DVD & Blu-ray track list
 [Music Clip]: Pop Master
 Nakano Sun Plaza "Mizuki Nana Ooini Utau"

Charts

Oricon Sales Chart (Japan)

References

2011 greatest hits albums
Nana Mizuki albums